"It's Not My Problem" is the fourth single released by Australian band Sneaky Sound System, taken from their second Australian studio album 2 (2008) and second UK compilation album Sneaky Sound System (2009).

Track listing

Charts
The song was the fourth most added track to the radio on 3 July 2009.

Release history

References

External links
"It's Not My Problem" (Thin White Duke Remix) EP on UK iTunes
"It's Not My Problem" EP on Australian iTunes

2009 singles
Sneaky Sound System songs
2009 songs
Songs written by Connie Mitchell